The men's javelin throw event at the 1950 British Empire Games was held on 11 February at the Eden Park in Auckland, New Zealand.

Results

References

Athletics at the 1950 British Empire Games
1950